Nancy E. Gwinn (born August 19, 1945) is an American librarian and administrator. She was the director of the Smithsonian Libraries, the world's largest museum library system, from 1997 until her retirement in 2020.

Education and career
Nancy Gwinn was born in Sheridan, Wyoming on August 19, 1945. She earned a Bachelor of Arts degree in 1967 from the University of Wyoming; after graduating, she attended the University of Oxford on a Fulbright scholarship. She went on to earn a Master of Library Science at the University of Michigan School of Library Science in 1969, and a Ph.D. in American civilization from George Washington University in 1996.

Gwinn started her library career in 1969 working as a reference librarian at the Library of Congress. From 1975 to 1980, she worked at the Council on Library and Information Resources, and in 1980 she became the associate director and program coordinator at the Research Library Group, where she was instrumental in founding the RLG Preservation Program, developing a model for libraries to collaborate on preservation microfilming.

Gwinn joined the Smithsonian Institution Libraries as the assistant director for library collections management in 1984. Since 1997 she has been the director of the Smithsonian Libraries, where she leads 130 research and curatorial staff in preserving cultural history. During her tenure, Gwinn has expanded outreach, bolstered the Libraries' rare book and electronic collections, and created the first Libraries Advisory Board to assist with fundraising. Under her leadership, the Smithsonian Libraries initiated and became the lead partner in establishing the Biodiversity Heritage Library, an international consortium of natural history and botanical libraries dedicated to digitizing and providing open access to works from their collections. Gwinn served as chair of the Biodiversity Heritage Library Members Council from 2011 to 2017.

Library leadership and awards
Gwinn has held a number of leadership roles in library organizations, including serving as president of the District of Columbia Library Association from 1979 to 1980, chairing the Association of Research Libraries Committee on Preservation of Library Material, and serving as secretary of the Standing Committee on Preservation and Conservation of the International Federation of Library Associations (IFLA). She has also served as a member of the IFLA Governing Board from 2004 to 2009 and as chair of its Professional Committee from 2007 to 2009.

Gwinn is the author of several books on library and historical subjects, including Preservation Microfilming: A Guide for Librarians and Archivists; the Society of American Archivists awarded her the 1988 Waldo Gifford Leland Award for that book.

In 2012 Gwinn was awarded the Ainsworth Rand Spofford President's Award by the District of Columbia Library Association, in recognition of "outstanding contributions to the development or improvement of library and information services".

The University of Wyoming awarded her an honorary doctorate degree in 2013.

Since 2003 Gwinn and her husband, Library of Congress Historian John Y. Cole, have maintained endowments to support the internships of library and information science students at the Smithsonian Libraries and at the University of Michigan School of Information. They also fund an endowment for supporting the operations of the technical services of the University of Wyoming Libraries.

References

External links
 

Living people
1945 births
American librarians
American women librarians
University of Wyoming alumni
University of Michigan School of Information alumni
Columbian College of Arts and Sciences alumni